Academy Fantasia, Season 8 is the eighth season of Academy Fantasia which premiered on True Visions in June 2011.

Changes from Season 7
Instead of the normal two audition channels, Live and Online, the 8th season introduced the third channel dubbed the Academic Institutions, where schools or universities could send their student in the name of the institute to participated the audition. 12 contestants who were selected by the judging panel will be eligible to compete in the house immediately without having to audition again with the participants from live and Online channels, and will receive their own V number to use in the competition. As a results, the number of contestants participated season 8 increase from the normal 12 finalists into 24 finalists, when combined with 12 contestants selected from the Live and Online Audition participants, made season 8 having the highest number of contestants with the V number for the competition in the show's history. The number of 24 contestants with the V number was after repeated on season 10 (2013). However, the judging panel judged that only 9 Academic-Institutions audition participants were qualified to attend the competition as a finalist, resulting in the number of the finalists from the Live and Online audition increased from 12 to 15 contestants.

However, after the season was premiered, it was announced that the main finalists of season 8 would still consists of 12 contestants, similar to season 4 (2007) and season 5 (2008) where the starting number of the seasons' finalists had more than twelve as well. Which means the 24 finalists had to compete for the final 12 spot in the first three weeks of the season. In which, each weeks of the first three weeks, four contestants who received the fewest popular votes, two from male side and two from female side, will be eliminated until there will be only 12 contestants left in the competition, after that, the main competition of the final 12 will begin.

Auditions
There were three channel for auditions, Live, Online and Academic institutions audition. The contestants were required to between the ages of 15 to 25 years old who are not embedded with music recording contracts.

The Live Auditions were held in the following cities:
 The South district, Surat Thani
 The Northeast district, Nakhon Ratchasima
 The North district, Chiangmai
 The Center district, Bangkok

Semi-finalists

Concert summaries

Top 24 - Semi-finals (Week 1)
Mentor: N/A

Group Performances
 Males - "อยู่บำรุง" (ว่าน ธนกฤต)
 Females - "ห้ามทิ้ง" (อะตอม ไมค์ไอดอล)
 Various Artists - "Too Much, So Much, Very Much" (Thongchai McIntyre)

Top 20 - Semi-finals (Week 2)
Mentor: สุนิตา ลีติกุล

Group Performances
 Tide, Ton, Ann, Earng & Wei Wei - "ไม่ต้องมีคำบรรยาย" (Mr.Team)
 Praewa, Pik, James, Team & Joy - "รักไม่ต้องการเวลา" (Klear)
 Kacha, Potay, Praew, Aon & Dew - "หัวใจผูกกัน" (Boyd Kosiyabong)
 Yuki, Lynn, Beer, Frame & Tao - "ทุ้มอยู่ในใจ" (Big Ass)

Top 16 - Semi-finals (Week 3)
Mentor: ปาน ธนพร

Group Performances
 Males - "หยุด" (Groove Riders)
 Females - "ลมหายใจ" (Mr.Z)
 Various Artists - "ขอบคุณ" (ป๊อด Moderndog & บุรินทร์ Feat. Palmy)
 Various Artists - "เกมเกียรติยศ" (จักรพรรณ์ อาบครบุรี)

Top 12 - Tata Young / Jirasak Parnpum
Mentor: Tata Young & Jirasak Parnpum

Group Performances
 Praewa, Lynn & Ann - "โอ๊ะ โอ๊ย" (Tata Young)
 Praew, Dew & Joy - "รบกวนมารักกัน" (Tata Young)
 Tide, Kacha & Tao - "เพลงลูกกรุง"  (Jirasak Parnpum)
 Ton, Jame & Frame - "ราตรีสวัสดิ์" (Jirasak Parnpum)

Top 11 - Heartbroken
Mentor: Boy Peacemaker

Group Performances
 Tide, Ton & James - "ผู้ชายคนนี้กำลังหมดแรง" (อ๊อฟ)
 Kacha, Frame & Tao - "เงียบๆ คนเดียว" (เบิร์ด ธงไชย)
 Praewa, Ann & Joy - "มารักทำไมตอนนี้" (Am Fine)
 Lynn & Praew - "ผิดไหม" (Fahrenheit)

Top 10 - In Love
Mentor: TBA

Group Performances
 Tide & Lynn - "วนาสวาท" (เบิร์ด ธงไชย / หนูนา)
 Praewa & Frame - "หนุ่มบาว สาวปาน" (คาราบาว / ปาน)
 Kacha & Tao - "อยากรู้แต่ไม่อยากถาม" (Calories Blah Blah)
 Ton & Joy - "Always" (Atlantic Starr)
 James & Praew - "เล็กๆ น้อยๆ" (มาลีวัลย์ / ปั่น)

Top 9 (First week) - Variety Dance
Mentor: Jennifer Kim / Raptor

Group Performances
 Praewa, Lynn, Praew & Joy - "Nobody" (Wonder Girls)
 Kacha, Ton & Tao - "La Bamba" (Los Lobos)
 James  & Frame - "เกรงใจ" (Raptor)
 Various Artists - "Summer Nights" (John Travolta and Olivia Newton-John)

Top 9 (Second week) - Killer Songs
Mentor: TBA

Group Performances
 Praewa & Frame - "Sukiyaki" (Kyu Sakamoto)
 Kacha & Lynn - "Macarena" (Los Del Rio)
 Ton & James - "Guantanamera" (Celia Cruz)
 Praew, Tao & Joy - "Xin Yuan Yang Hu Die Meng" (Huang An)

Top 8 - His Majesty The King's Songs, Thai Contemporary & Thai Country
Mentor: TBA

Group Performances
 Praewa & James - "ผัวเมียพอๆ กัน" (สรเพชร / น้องนุช)
 Kacha & Frame - "ชวนน้องแต่งงาน" (ยอดรัก สลักใจ)
 Ton & Praew - "มะนาวไม่มีน้ำ" (ไพรวัลย์ / วิภารัตน์ฯ)
 Tao & Joy - "หนุ่มนาข้าวสาวนาเกลือ" (สรเพชร / น้อง)
 Praewa, Praew & Joy - "ใกล้รุ่ง" (เพลงพระราชนิพนธ์)
 Kacha, James & Tao - "เกิดเป็นไทย ตายเพื่อไทย"
 Ton & Frame - "ชะตาชีวิต" (เพลงพระราชนิพนธ์)
 Various Artists - "แผ่นดินของเรา" (เพลงพระราชนิพนธ์)

Top 7 (First Week) - Musical
Mentor: TBA

Group Performances
 Various Artists - "ยังไงก็บ้านเรา" (เฉลียง)
 Various Artists - "เอาอะไรมาแลกก็ไม่ยอม" (บิลลี่)
 Various Artists - "ของขวัญจากก้อนดิน" (Thongchai McIntyre)
 Various Artists - "จับมือกันไว้" (Thongchai McIntyre)

Top 7 (Second Week) - Songs of 'Ohm Chatri' & 'Dee Nitipong'
Mentor: TBA

Final - Grand Finale
Mentor: TBA

Group Performances
 Tide, Weaw, Wei Wei - "Rolling In The Deep" (Glee Cast)
 Praewa, Yuki & Ann - "Telephone" (Lady Gaga)
 Pik & Dew - "โอ้โฮบางกอก" (แมงปอ ชลธิชา)
 Potay, Earng, Team & Joy - "ฤดูที่แตกต่าง" (Room39)
 Lynn, Poyzian & Tum - "อกหัก" (Bodyslam)
 Friendship - "อยากบอกรักเธอ" (ไชยา มิตรชัย)
 Beer & Aon - "เธอที่รัก" (Paradox)

Finalists

In order of elimination
(ages stated are at time of competition)

Summaries

Elimination chart

Professional trainers
Principal
 Narinthorn Na-Bangchang

Voice Trainers

Dance Trainers

Acting Trainers

Judges
 Tata Young
 Jirasak Panpum
 Suthee Saengserichol
 Prakasit Bosuwan
 Vanessa Gunsopol

References

2011 Thai television seasons